Shotoriyeh (also Romanized as Shotorīyeh; also known as Shotorgah) is a village in Farmahin Rural District, in the Central District of Farahan County, Markazi Province, Iran. At the 2006 census, its population was 620, in 167 families.

References 

Populated places in Farahan County